Rudolf Ewald Stier (17 March 1800 – 16 December 1862), was a German Protestant churchman and mystic.

Stier was born at Fraustadt (Wschowa) in South Prussia and studied at the University of Halle and Humboldt University, Berlin, first law and afterwards theology; he continued his theological studies later at the pastoral seminary of Wittenberg. In 1824 he was made professor at the Missionary Institute in Basel. Afterwards he held pastorates at Frankleben near Merseburg (1829) and at Wichlinghausen (now part of Wuppertal) (1838). In 1850 he was appointed superintendent at Schkeuditz, and in 1859 at Eisleben.

He published a new edition of Martin Luther's Catechism and a translation of the Bible based on that of Luther; but he is noted chiefly for his thoughtful, devotional and mystical commentary on the Words of the Lord (Reden des Herrn, 3 vols., 1843; Eng. trans., 8 vols., 1855–1858). He died at Eisleben.

His other works, besides commentaries on the Psalms, Second Isaiah, Proverbs, Ephesians, Hebrews, Epistles of James and Jude, include: Die Reden der Apostel (2 vols, 1824–1830; Eng. trans., 1869) and Die Reden der Engel in den heiligen Schrift (1862). Cf. J. P. Lacroix, The Life of R. Stier (New York, 1874).

References

External links
 

1800 births
1862 deaths
19th-century German Protestant theologians
University of Halle alumni
Humboldt University of Berlin alumni
People from Wschowa
German Lutherans
19th-century German male writers
German male non-fiction writers
19th-century Lutherans